Master W with the Key also known as Master WA and Master of the Housemark (active c. 1465–1490) was an anonymous Netherlandish engraver, who is thought to have been a goldsmith in Bruges. The name given to him refers to his monogram, which is a W followed by a key symbol. Eighty-two works signed with that monogram are extant. Many of these are ornament prints, depicting elements of gothic architecture and decorative objects, and were probably marketed mainly as patterns for other craftsmen to follow. He also produced prints of ships, the first known. He influenced several other contemporary Dutch engravers, most notably Master I. A. M. of Zwolle. He probably worked for Duke Charles the Bold of Burgundy, and his ship series may have been "portraits" of the ducal fleet.

Notes

References
Russell, Margarita. Visions of the Sea: Hendrick C. Vroom and the origins of Dutch marine painting, Brill Archive, Leiden, 1983,

External links

"Master W with the Key: Foliate Ornament (29.16.1)". In Heilbrunn Timeline of Art History. New York: The Metropolitan Museum of Art, 2000–.  Retrieved 21 April 2009
Two prints from Cleveland Museum of Art.

15th-century births
Year of death unknown
15th-century engravers
W with the Key
Flemish engravers
Flemish marine artists